Badra may refer to:

Badra, Germany, a city in Germany
Badra, India, a city in India
Badra, Iran, a city in western Iran
Badra, Iraq, a city in eastern Iraq